The Greek Catholic Church in Slovakia (Slovak: Gréckokatolícka cirkev na Slovensku), or Byzantine Catholic Church in Slovakia, is a metropolitan sui iuris Eastern Catholic particular church in full communion with the Catholic Church and the Pope of Rome. Its liturgical rite is the Byzantine Rite. In 2008 in Slovakia alone, the Greek Catholic Church in Slovakia had some 350,000 faithful, 374 priests and 254 parishes. In 2017, the Catholic Church counted 207,320 Greek Catholics in Slovakia worldwide, representing roughly one percent of all Eastern Catholics.

History
Since the unanimous acceptance of the Union of Uzhhorod on the territory that includes present day eastern Slovakia in 1646, the history of the Slovak Greek Catholic Church was  intertwined with that of the Ruthenian Greek Catholic Church for a period of several centuries. At the end of World War I, most Greek Catholic Ruthenians and Slovaks were included within the territory of Czechoslovakia, including two eparchies, Prešov and Mukačevo. The eparchy of Prešov, created on September 22, 1818, was removed in 1937 from the jurisdiction of the Hungarian primate and subjected directly to the Holy See, while the 21 parishes of the eparchy of Prešov that were in Hungary were formed into the new exarchate of Miskolc.

After World War II, the eparchy of Mukačevo in Transcarpathia was annexed by the Soviet Union, thus the eparchy of Prešov included all the Greek Catholics that remained in Czechoslovakia. After communists seized the country in April 1950, a "synod" was convoked at Prešov, at which five priests and a number of laymen signed a document declaring that the union with Rome was disbanded and asking to be received into the jurisdiction of the Moscow Patriarchate, later the Orthodox Church of Czechoslovakia. Greek Catholic bishop Blessed Pavel Petro Gojdič of Prešov along with his auxiliary, Blessed Basil Hopko, were imprisoned and bishop Gojdič died in prison in 1960.

During the Prague Spring in 1968, the former Greek Catholic parishes were allowed to restore communion with Rome. Of the 292 parishes involved, 205 voted in favor. This was one of the few reforms by Dubček that survived the Soviet invasion the same year. However, most of their church buildings remained in the hands of Orthodox Church.

After communism was overthrown in the 1989 Velvet Revolution, Church property was gradually returned to the Slovak Greek Catholic Church. This process was almost completed by 1993, the year after the dissolution of Czechoslovakia into the Czech Republic and Slovakia. For Greek Catholics in the Czech Republic, a separate Apostolic Vicariate was created, elevated in 1996 to an exarchate thus forming the Apostolic Exarchate in the Czech Republic (now considered part of Ruthenian Catholic Church); the 2007 Annuario Pontificio indicated that it had by then grown to having 177,704 faithful, 37 priests and 25 parishes.

In Slovakia itself, Pope John Paul II created an Apostolic Exarchate of Košice in 1997.  Pope Benedict XVI raised this to the level of an Eparchy on January 30, 2008 and at the same time erected the new Byzantine-rite Eparchy of Bratislava.  He also raised Prešov to the level of  a metropolitan see, constituting the Slovak Greek Catholic Church as a sui iuris metropolitan Church.

Structure

Slovakia:
Archeparchy of Prešov with the following suffragans:
Eparchy of Bratislava
Eparchy of Košice

Abroad
In the United States and Canada, the Slovak Greek Catholics fall under the jurisdiction of the Ruthenian Greek Catholic Church, with the Exarchate of Saints Cyril and Methodius of Toronto for Slovak Greek Catholics reduced from an eparchy and transferred to Ruthenian authority in 2022.

References

Sources

External links
Byzantine Catholic Church in Slovakia - unofficial website
 Gréckokatolícke arcibiskupstvo Prešov
 Gréckokatolícka eparchia Košice
 Gréckokatolícka eparchia Bratislava
Eparchy of Ss. Cyril and Methodius for Slovaks of the Byzantine Rite in Canada 
 Apoštolský exarchát řeckokatolické církve v České republice
 Byzantine Catholic Seminary in Prešov
Slovak Cathedral of the Nativity of the Mother of God (Toronto)
 Gréckokatolícka farnosť a protopresbyterát Medzilaborce
Article on the Slovak Greek Catholic Church by Ronald Roberson on the CNEWA web site
www.damian-hungs.de (in German)